Immaculate Heart Central High School is a private, Roman Catholic high school in Watertown, New York.  It is located within the Roman Catholic Diocese of Ogdensburg.

Background
Immaculate Heart was established in 1881 by the Sisters of St. Joseph as Immaculate Heart Academy, a co-educational private prep academy.  The original campus was located at 362 West Main Street in Watertown, New York. The current location is on 1316 Ives St in Watertown, NY. IHC has a well documented reputation in Upstate New York concerning academics. IHC has dominated other schools in the local area concerning academics, as it has out performed, and maintained a higher average on standardized tests than any other local district. To continue their reputable education standards, 65% of IHC graduates earn a New York State Regents Diploma with Advanced Designation or Advanced Designation with Honors, and an impressive 100% Graduation and College Matriculation rate. IHC serves about 500 students in the Jefferson County and Fort Drum area. With such close proximity to Fort Drum, about 30% of students that attend IHC are active duty military affiliated.

With its connection to the Ogdensburg Diocese, it is not a surprise that there in faith based connections in this school. IHC prides itself on its service to the community with many students active in community service projects in area. With a  “faith community” of students, parents, grandparents, teachers, thousands of alumni, local parishioners and other community members committed to quality Catholic education.

References

External links
 School Website

Catholic secondary schools in New York (state)
Educational institutions established in 1881
Roman Catholic Diocese of Ogdensburg
Schools in Jefferson County, New York
1881 establishments in New York (state)
School buildings in Watertown, New York